Crypsotidia piscicaudae is a moth of the family Erebidae. It is found in Ghana, Mali, Nigeria and Senegal.

References

Moths described in 2005
Crypsotidia